List of Markets in Vienna.

1st District (Innere Stadt) 
Markt am Donaukanal
 Place: [[Zwischen Augartenbrücke and Aspernbrücke
 Opening hours: Mai til September Saturday 14-20 o'clock, Sunday 10-20 o'clock
 Accessibility: U4
 Kunstgewerbe, Kunstgegenstände, Antiquitäten, books

Antiquitätenmarkt Am Hof
 Place: Rund um die Mariensäule 
 Opening hours 1.03. til Saturday vor 24.12: Friday and Saturday 10-20 o'clock Angebot: Kunstgegenstände and Antiquitäten
 Accessibility: 1A, 2A, 3A

Biobauern-Markt Freyung
 Place: Freyung 
 Opening hours: Ganzjährig in allen ungeraden Kalenderwochen, Friday and Saturday 9-18 o'clock
 Accessibility: 1A Freyung. U2 Schottentor, U3 Herrengasse
 Lebensmittel aus kontrolliert biologischem Anbau

Temporärer Markt Freyung
 Place: Freyung 
 Opening hours: May til November, Tuesday til Thursday 10-18.30 o'clock Angebot: Lebensmittel (mit Landparteien)
 Accessibility: 1A Freyung, U2 Schottentor, U3 Herrengasse

 Former markets
 Bauernmarkt
 Fleischmarkt, Greek Quarter
 Getreidemarkt
 Am Haarmarkt (also Flachsmarkt, now Rotenturmstraße)
 Hoher Markt
 Am Kienmarkt (now Ruprechtsplatz)
 Kohlmarkt (formerly Witmarkt, Kohlenmarkt)
 Neuer Markt (formerly Mehlmarkt)
 Am Rossmarkt (now Renngasse)
 Salzgasse
 Schweinemarkt (now Lobkowitzplatz)
 Wildpretmarkt (formerly Neuer Kienmarkt)

2nd District (Leopoldstadt) 

Karmelitermarkt
 Place: Im Werd, Krummbaumgasse, Leopoldsgasse, Haidgasse 
 Opening hours: Monday til Friday 6-19.30 o'clock, Saturday 6-17 o'clock
 Gastronomy: Monday til Saturday/Shabbath 6 til 22 o'clock
 Accessibility: 5A, nearby Karmeliterplatz, and part of the Karmeliterviertel
 Bio-Eck jeden Saturday/Shabbath, market with farmhouse market

Vorgartenmarkt
 Place: Wohlmutstraße, Ennsgasse 
 Opening hours: Monday til Friday 6-19.30 o'clock, Saturday 6-17 o'clock
 Gastronomy: Monday til Saturday 6 til 22 o'clock
 Accessibility: 82A
 market with farmhouse market

Volkertmarkt
 Place: Volkertplatz 
 Opening hours: Monday til Friday 6-19.30 o'clock, Saturday 6-17 o'clock
 Gastronomy: Monday til Saturday 6 til 22 o'clock
 Accessibility: 80A
 market with farmhouse market

 Former markets
 Tandelmarkt (now Tandelmarktgasse), Jewish street

3rd District 

Rochusmarkt
 Place: Landstraßer Hauptstraße, Rasumofskygasse 
 Opening hours: Monday til Friday 6-19.30 o'clock, Saturday 6-17 o'clock
 Gastronomy: Monday til Saturday 6 til 22 o'clock
 Accessibility: U3, 4A, 74A
 market with farmhouse market

Landstraßer Markt
 Place: Invalidenstraße 2 
 Opening hours: Seit 2008 geschlossen.
 Accessibility: U3, U4, S-Bahn, O, 74A

 Former markets
 Heumarkt (Am Heumarkt Street, formerly Heugries, Im Gereit)
 Viehmarktgasse

4th and 6th District 

Naschmarkt
 Place: Wienzeile between Getreidemarkt and Kettenbrückengasse 
 Opening hours: Monday til Friday 6-19.30 o'clock, Saturday 6-17 o'clock
 Gastronomy: Monday til Saturday 6-23 o'clock, farmhouse market jeden Saturday til 17 o'clock
 Accessibility: U4, 59A

Flohmarkt
 Place: Linke Wienzeile bei der Kettenbrückengasse 
 Opening hours: Saturday 6.30-18 o'clock (auch an Feiertagen)
 Accessibility: U4

Temporärer Markt Mariahilfer Straße
 Place: Vorplatz]] der Kirche Maria Hilf 
 Opening hours: Monday, Wednesday, Friday 9-18:30 o'clock, Saturday 9-14 o'clock, erster Saturday/Monat 9-18 o'clock
 Accessibility: U3, 2A, 13A, 14A

10th District 
Viktor-Adler-markt
 Place: Viktor-Adler-Platz 
 Opening hours: Monday til Friday 6-19.30 o'clock, Saturday 6-17 o'clock
 Gastronomie Monday til Saturday 6 til 22 o'clock
 Accessibility: U1, 6, 14A, 67
 market with farmhouse market

11th District 

Simmeringer Markt
 Place: Geiselbergstraße, Lorystraße 
 Opening hours: Seit 2009 geschlossen
 Accessibility: U3 (Enkplatz), 6
 Ursprünglicher Standort war im 19. Jahrhundert der Enkplatz, im Zuge des Baus der Neusimmeringer Pfarrkirche wurde der Markt zuerst in die Sedlitzkygasse and dann hierher verlegt. Bis Mai 2009 befand sich hier ein Markt with farmhouse market and Gastronomie, seither wird das Areal in ein Bildungszentrum umgebaut. In das denkmalgeschützten Marktamtsgebäude soll eine Kinderbücherei einziehen, die ebenfalls unter Denkmalschutz stehende öffentliche WC-Anlage wird als Zugang zu einer Volksgarage genutzt.

12th District 
Meidlinger Markt
 Place: Niederhofstraße, Rosaliagasse, Reschgasse, Ignazgasse 
 Opening hours: Monday til Friday 6-19.30 o'clock, Saturday 6-17 o'clock
 Gastronomy: Monday til Saturday 6 til 21 o'clock
 Accessibility: U6, 10A, 63A
 market with farmhouse market

15th District 

Meiselmarkt
 Place: Hütteldorfer Straße, Ecke Johnstraße 
 Opening hours: Monday til Friday 6-19.30 o'clock, Saturday 6-17 o'clock 
 Gastronomy: Monday til Saturday 6 til 21 o'clock
 Accessibility: U3, 10A, 12A, 49
 market with farmhouse market

Schwendermarkt
 Place: Schwendergasse, Mariahilfer Straße 
 Opening hours: Monday til Friday 6-21 o'clock, Saturday 6-17 o'clock
 Gastronomy: Monday til Saturday 6 til 21 o'clock
 Accessibility: 12A, 52, 58

16th District 
Brunnenmarkt and Yppenmarkt
 Place: Brunnengasse and Yppenplatz 
 Opening hours: Monday til Friday 6-19.30 o'clock, Saturday 6-17 o'clock
 Gastronomy: Monday til Saturday 6 til 22 o'clock
 Accessibility: U6, 2, 44, 46
 Märkte with farmhouse market

18th District 
Kutschkermarkt
 Place: Kutschkergasse 
 Opening hours: Monday til Friday 6-19.30 o'clock, Saturday 6-17 o'clock
 Gastronomy: Monday til Saturday 6 til 21 o'clock
 Accessibility: 40, 41
 Bio-Eck jeden Saturday, market with farmhouse market

Gersthofer Markt
 Place: Gersthofer Platzl 
 Opening hours: Monday til Friday 6-19.30 o'clock, Saturday 6-17 o'clock
 Gastronomy: Monday til Saturday 6 til 21 o'clock
 Accessibility: S-Bahn (S45), 9, 10A, 40, 41
 market with farmhouse market

Johann-Nepomuk-Vogl-markt
 Place: Johann-Nepomuk-Vogl-Platz 
 Opening hours: Monday til Friday 6-19.30 o'clock, Saturday 6-17 o'clock
 Gastronomy: Monday til Saturday 6 til 21 o'clock
 Accessibility: 9, 42

19th District 
Nußdorfer Markt
 Place: Heiligenstädter Straße, Sickenberggasse 
 Opening hours: Monday til Friday 6-19.30 o'clock, Saturday 6-17 o'clock
 Gastronomy: Monday til Saturday 6 til 21 o'clock 
 Accessibility: D

Sonnbergmarkt
 Place: Sonnbergplatz 
 Opening hours: Monday til Friday 6-19.30 o'clock, Saturday 6-17 o'clock
 Gastronomy: Monday til Saturday 6 til 21 o'clock 
 Accessibility: S-Bahn (S45), 35A

20th District 
Hannovermarkt
 Place: Hannovergasse, Othmargasse 
 Opening hours: Monday til Friday 6-18.30 o'clock, Saturday 6-14 o'clock
 Accessibility: 5, 31, 33
 market with farmhouse market

21st District 
Floridsdorfer Markt
 Place: Brünner Straße, Pitkagasse 
 Opening hours: Monday til Friday 6-19.30 o'clock, Saturday 6-17 o'clock
 Gastronomy: Monday til Saturday 6 til 21 o'clock
 Accessibility: 30, 31 
 market with farmhouse market

22nd District 
Genochmarkt
 Place: Genochplatz 
 Opening hours: Monday til Friday 6-19.30 o'clock, Saturday 6-17 o'clock
 Accessibility: S-Bahn, 26, 26A, 27A, 83A, 94A, 95B, 96B

Temporärer Markt Quadenstraße
 Place: bei der Maschlgasse
 Opening hours: Wednesday 12-18.30 o'clock, Saturday 7-13 o'clock
 Accessibility: 95B

Temporärer Markt Wacquantgasse
 Place: Siegesplatz
 Opening hours: Friday 13-19 o'clock
 Accessibility: 26, 84A, 93A, 97A

23rd District 
Temporärer Markt Liesing
 Place: Liesinger Platz
 Opening hours: Tuesday and Friday 12-18.30 o'clock, Saturday 7-13 o'clock
 Accessibility: S-Bahn, 60A, 62A, 64A, 66A

Literature 
 Werner T. Bauer, Jörg Klauber (photography): Die Wiener Märkte: 100 Märkte, von Naschmarkt til Flohmarkt. Mit einer umfassenden Geschichte des Marktwesens in Wien. Falter, Wien 1996,

External links 
 Wiener Märkte
 Wiener Märkte and Lebensmittelaufsicht

References 

 
 
Vienna
Vienna
Vienna-related lists